Cochonnet, small pig in French (piglet may rather translate in porcelet), may refer to :
 a character in Flup, Nénesse, Poussette and Cochonnet, a minor comics by Hergé
 a small wooden ball used in pétanque